Mikael Dahlqvist (born 1967) is a Swedish politician.  he serves as Member of the Riksdag representing the constituency of Värmland County.

He was also elected as Member of the Riksdag in September 2018 and September 2022.

References 

Living people
1967 births
Place of birth missing (living people)
21st-century Swedish politicians
Members of the Riksdag 2014–2018
Members of the Riksdag 2018–2022
Members of the Riksdag 2022–2026
Members of the Riksdag from the Social Democrats